Bauhinia seleriana is a species of plant in the family Fabaceae. It is found from central and southern Mexico to Honduras.

References

seleriana
Endemic flora of Honduras
Critically endangered flora of North America
Taxonomy articles created by Polbot